Uili Kolo'ofai (born 29 September 1982, in Auckland, New Zealand) is a rugby union player from Tonga. He plays for the Tongan national side and previously for Newcastle Falcons as lock. Kolo'ofai was named in Tonga's 2015 Rugby World Cup squad.

Kolo'ofai signed with Newcastle Falcons in 2014 on a two-year contract. After only a year he left the club due to injury woes that saw him make only a few appearances for the Falcons. He played in Japan before he moved to Europe and played in Italy for Parma and Cavalieri Prato. Then he moved to France and played for Colomiers before joining the Newcastle Falcons. After granted early release from Newcastle, Kolofai signed for Jersey Reds from the 2015-16 RFU Championship season.

References

External links

Tonga international rugby union players
Tongan expatriate rugby union players
Otago rugby union players
Cavalieri Prato players
1982 births
Rugby union players from Auckland
Living people
Rugby union flankers
Rugby union locks
Newcastle Falcons players